Waykira (Aymara wayku gorge; mountain brook, ira mine, "gorge mine" or "mountain brook mine", also spelled Huayquera) is a  mountain in the Andes of Peru, about  high. It is located in the Puno Region, Lampa Province, on the border of the districts Palca and Paratía. Waykira lies southeast of the mountain Qillqa and south of Hatun Pastu.

References

Mountains of Puno Region
Mountains of Peru